Oleksandr Oksentiyovych Shevchenko (26 June 1937 – 15 January 2016) was a Ukrainian scientist, jurist, politician, and doctor of legal sciences.

Shevchenko was born on June 26, 1937 in sovkhoz Partizany, Simferopol Raion, Russian SFSR. He graduated from the historic-philosophy faculty of Kiev University in 1965. Shevchenko obtained his doctorate in 1995. After graduation, he worked at Dnipropetrovsk National University and as an English language interpreter during construction of a metallurgy plant in Egypt. Since 1971 Shevchenko has worked at Kiev University.

In the October 2014 parliamentary election Shevchenko was 31st on the election list of his party; since the party came 0.29% short to overcome the 5% threshold to win seats on the nationwide list he was not elected into parliament.

References

External links

 Biography at the Jurist Encyclopedia
 Oleksandr Shevchenko: Once Israel attacks Iran, Russia will occupy Ukraine. Glavcom. September 14, 2012

1937 births
2016 deaths
People from Simferopol Raion
Ukrainian jurists
Taras Shevchenko National University of Kyiv alumni
Academic staff of the Taras Shevchenko National University of Kyiv
Seventh convocation members of the Verkhovna Rada
Svoboda (political party) politicians
Legal historians